Mont Ruan (or Grand Mont Ruan) is a mountain in the Chablais Alps, overlooking the lake of Emosson in the Swiss canton of Valais. At 3,057 metres above sea level, its main summit is located 200 metres away from the French border, where lies a slightly lower summit (3,044 m).

Mont Ruan is the westernmost mountain rising above 3,000 metres in Switzerland.

References

External links
Mont Ruan on Hikr

Mountains of the Alps
Alpine three-thousanders
Mountains of Valais
Mountains partially in France
Mountains of Switzerland